The list of ship launches in 1716 includes a chronological list of some ships launched in 1716.


References

1716
Ship launches